This is a list of naval air stations of the Royal Navy.  Naval air stations are land bases of the Fleet Air Arm, the branch of the Royal Navy responsible for the operation of naval aircraft.

Current naval air stations
Currently RNAS means "Royal Naval Air Station" and, in common with the Royal Air Force, is always followed by a geographical place in which the air station is located. Historically, RNAS referred to the Royal Naval Air Service, the aviation branch of the Royal Navy which merged in 1918 with the Royal Flying Corps of the British Army to form the independent Royal Air Force.

Between 1918 and 1939, the Royal Air Force had provided the Fleet Air Arm to the Royal Navy, and Royal Naval Air Stations were consequently operated by Royal Air force personnel.

In 1939, operation of the Fleet Air Arm was transferred to the Royal Navy, with Royal Air Force personnel replaced by Royal Naval personnel, or transferring to the Royal Navy. As the Coastal Command remained part of the Royal Air Force, Royal Naval Air Stations, since 1939, have generally operated ship-borne types of aircraft when it has been necessary for them to be operated from shore.

 RNAS Culdrose (HMS Seahawk) – Culdrose, Helston, Cornwall, England
 RNAS Predannack (satellite airfield) – Mullion, Cornwall
 RNAS Yeovilton (HMS Heron) –  Yeovilton, Somerset, England
 RNAS Merryfield (satellite airfield) – Ilton, Somerset

Former naval air stations

Former naval air stations by ship name (HMS xxx)
HMS means Her Majesty's Ship (or His Majesty's Ship if before February 1952).

Some smaller and some very early Naval Air Stations in the list above were not commissioned as HM Ship(s).  Those below were commissioned and, therefore, have a ship's name. Royal Navy shore bases and naval air stations have traditionally been named in the same manner as seagoing ships.

Officers were appointed to HMS xxx rather than to RNAS xxx and, similarly, ratings' Service Certificates will show only the name of the ship when drafted to a Naval Air Station.  Thus, this list may help when researching family history records.

See also
Mobile Naval Air Base
List of airports in the United Kingdom and the British Crown Dependencies
List of Royal Air Force stations
List of Royal Navy shore establishments
Royal Navy Dockyard
Seaplane bases in the United Kingdom
Aircraft Handler
List of airfields of the Army Air Corps
Lists of military installations
 List of British Army installations

References

Fleet Air Arm
 
 
Royal Navy Air stations